San Biagio is a church dedicated to Saint Blaise, in the sestiere of Castello in Venice, northern Italy.

The church now stands adjacent to the Museo Storico Navale, and is officiated by a military chaplain. Till 1511, this served as the church for the Greek community which had emigrated to Venice after the Fall of Constantinople.  It was rebuilt in 1745-1752, likely to plans of Filippo Rossi. The vault was frescoed by Giovanni Scajaro with Saint Blaise in Glory. The altars were transferred here from the church of Sant'Anna. The left hand wall has funerary monument with the heart of Francis Frederick, Archduke of Austria (died 1847). The tomb of Admiral Angelo Emo (died 1792) has a statue (1818) by Giovanni Ferrari.

References

Roman Catholic churches in Venice
Roman Catholic churches completed in 1752
18th-century Roman Catholic church buildings in Italy